Sérgio Filipe Santos Oliveira, known as Pirata (born 1 February 1987) is a retired Portuguese footballer.

Club career
He made his professional debut in the Segunda Liga for Ovarense on 12 March 2006 in a game against Gondomar.

References

1987 births
People from Ovar
Living people
Portuguese footballers
A.D. Ovarense players
Liga Portugal 2 players
A.D. Sanjoanense players
G.D. Joane players
Anadia F.C. players
C.F. União de Lamas players
S.C. Beira-Mar players
Lusitânia F.C. players
Association football forwards
Sportspeople from Aveiro District